Marshfield Clinic Health System is an integrated health system serving Wisconsin founded in 1916. The system contains several hospitals and many clinics throughout Wisconsin, as well as a medical research institute and an education division, and employs more than 1,200 doctors and other clinicians.

History
The clinic was founded in 1916 by six local physicians: K.W. Doege, William Hipke, Victor Mason, Walter G. Sexton, H.H. Milbee, and Roy P. Potter, in the community of Marshfield, Wisconsin.

Organization
Marshfield Clinic Health System's primary operations include facilities in Marshfield, Eau Claire, Wausau/Weston, and Rice Lake. As of 2022, the health system has 10 hospitals (including two in Marshfield) and 50-60 clinics throughout Wisconsin.

Marshfield Clinic Health System also has several component centers, including:
Marshfield Clinic Research Institute, founded in 1959, is the largest private medical research institute in Wisconsin. The Research Institute consists of six research centers:
National Farm Medicine Center, which also houses the National Children's Center for Rural and Agricultural Health and Safety, directed by Barbara C. Lee
Center for Clinical Epidemiology & Population Health
Center for Precision Medicine
Center for Oral and Systemic Health
Clinical Research Center
Cancer Care and Research Center
The Division of Education provides residency programs for medical school graduates in internal medicine, pediatrics, medicine and pediatrics, dermatology, and surgery. About 125 members of the Marshfield Clinic Health System staff hold clinical teaching appointments from the University of Wisconsin School of Medicine and Public Health.
Marshfield Clinic Laboratories is a system of laboratories that employs more than 450 people and performs more than 20 million tests annually. It has separate services for forensic toxicology, food safety and veterinary diagnostics.
Security Health Plan of Wisconsin is Marshfield Clinic Health System's health maintenance organization (HMO), established in 1986 as an outgrowth of the Greater Marshfield Community Health Plan, which began in 1971 as one of the earliest HMOs in the country.

Facilities 
The Laird Center for Medical Research, dedicated in 1997 and named after former U.S. Secretary of Defense Melvin Laird, is a medical research and education facility on the campus of Marshfield Clinic Health System. The Lawton Center for Medical Research is a similar facility dedicated to Ben Lawton, a  thoracic surgeon at Marshfield Clinic during the 20th century.

References

External links
Official website
Marshfield Clinic Research Institute
Marshfield Clinic Laboratories

1916 establishments in Wisconsin
Buildings and structures in Wood County, Wisconsin
Medical and health organizations based in Wisconsin
Healthcare in Wisconsin
Hospital networks in the United States
Non-profit organizations based in Wisconsin
Public health organizations
Research organizations in the United States
Wood County, Wisconsin